National Defence College, Uganda is a National Security and Strategic Studies training and educational institution in Uganda.

Location
The college is located in Njeru, in Buikwe District.

Overview
The Defence College is expected to produce graduates in strategic leadership to government on national and international security matters. It is intended to be an institute of excellence on defence, security and national development.

In September 2018, the Ugandan Chief of Defence Forces, General David Muhoozi, established a committee to spearhead the establishment of the defence college in 2019. The committee was  chaired by Lieutenant General Nakibus Lakara, the Commander of the Uganda Rapid Deployment Capability Centre (URDCC), based in Jinja. Lydia Wanyoto, a Ugandan lawyer, politician and diplomat, was one of the committee members.

According to the army commander, the National Defence College will offer training to civilians, military, national security professionals and future leaders. The training is intended to educate the students about the strategic security environment and the management of complexities at a strategic level. At this time, the UPDF has a sufficient number of senior officers, with the requisite knowledge, experience and background information to become instructors at the defence college.

The NDCU admitted its first cohort of students, numbering about 20, in January 2022. The students are first-star generals (Brigadier), senior military commanders (Colonel) and high ranking government personnel.

The College is affiliated with Makerere University, Uganda's oldest and largest public university. Graduates will receive a National Defence Collège badge and a master's degree, awarded by Makerere University.

Courses
As of January 2022, the college offers two courses (a) Postgraduate Diploma in National Security Studies and (b) Masters in Security Strategy, offered in collaboration with Makerere University.

Pioneer class
Members of the pioneer class at NDCU (2022), include Brigadier Flavia Byekwaso, previously spokesperson for the UPDF. Others are Colonel Edith Nakalema, previously Head of State House Anti Corruption Unit (SHACU), and Brigadier Peter Candia, previously Commander of the Special Forces Command (SFC). There are 18 UPDF officers in the pioneer class.

See also
 Uganda Senior Command and Staff College
 Uganda Military Academy
 University of Military Science and Technology
 List of military schools in Uganda
 List of universities in Uganda

References

External links
CDF Gen David Muhoozi launches Uganda National Defence College (NDC) Steering Committee As of 10 September 2018.
Uganda Gets First National Defense College As of 14 December 2021.

Military academies
Military of Uganda
Military schools in Uganda
Uganda People's Defence Force
Buikwe District
Educational institutions established in 2019
2019 establishments in Uganda
Central Region, Uganda